Just Ear-rings is the 1965 debut album by Dutch Nederbeat band Golden Earring (formerly The Golden Earrings).

Track listing
All songs written by Gerritsen and Kooymans except where noted.

Original track listing

Side 1
 "Nobody but You" - 2:18
 "I Hate Saying These Words" - 2:17
 "She May Be" (Kooymans) - 1:47
 "Holy Witness" (Kooymans) - 2:47
 "No Need to Worry" (Gerritsen) - 2:04
 "Please Go" - 2:56

Side 2
 "Sticks and Stones" (Titus Turner) - 1:41
 "I Am a Fool" (Gerritsen) - 2:06
 "Don't Stay Away" - 2:10
 "Lonely Everyday" - 1:42
 "When People Talk" - 2:47
 "Now I Have" (Kooymans) - 1:38

CD reissue bonus tracks
 "Chunk of Steel" (de Ronde/Gerritsen/Kooymans) - 2:25
 "The Words I Need" - 2:14
 "Waiting for You" - 2:25
 "What You Gonna Tell" - 1:47
 "Wings" - 2:12
 "Smoking Cigarettes" (Kooymans) - 2:19

Personnel

Musicians
George Kooymans - guitar, vocals
Rinus Gerritsen - bass, keyboard
Jaap Eggermont - drums
Frans Krassenburg - vocals
Peter de Ronde - rhythm guitar

Additional
Producer - Fred Haayen - production
Art & Design - mostremarkable (Almere)

References

Golden Earring albums
1965 debut albums
Polydor Records albums